Rafaela de Miranda Travalão (born 18 August 1988), also known as Rafinha, is a Brazilian footballer currently playing for Ferroviária in the Campeonato Brasileiro de Futebol Feminino and also plays for the Brazil national team.

Club career
She played for the Boston Breakers of the National Women's Soccer League in the 2015 season.

She was waived by the Boston Breakers in October 2015.

In 2016, she joined Austrian ÖFB-Frauenliga club St. Pölten-Spratzern.

Since 2017, Rafinha has played her club football in Brazil.

International career
In July 2013 Rafinha represented Brazil at the 2013 Summer Universiade in Kazan, Russia. She made her senior debut in September 2013, against New Zealand at the 2013 Valais Women's Cup. At the 2014 South American Games, Rafinha scored the winning goal in Brazil's 2–1 win over Colombia. On the eve of the 2015 FIFA Women's World Cup, Rafina was called into Brazil's squad as a replacement for Érika, who had sustained a knee injury.

International goals

Honors
Ferroviária
Winner
 Campeonato Brasileiro de Futebol Feminino: 2014

Runners-up
 Campeonato Paulista de Futebol Feminino: 2014

References

External links
 
 Boston Breakers player profile

1988 births
Living people
Brazilian women's footballers
National Women's Soccer League players
Boston Breakers players
Expatriate women's soccer players in the United States
Women's association football midfielders
2015 FIFA Women's World Cup players
Associação Ferroviária de Esportes (women) players
Santos FC (women) players
Brazilian expatriate sportspeople in the United States
Brazil women's international footballers
Brazilian expatriate footballers
Expatriate women's footballers in Austria
FSK St. Pölten-Spratzern players
Sport Club Corinthians Paulista (women) players
Botucatu Futebol Clube players
Universiade bronze medalists for Brazil
Universiade medalists in football
ÖFB-Frauenliga players
Medalists at the 2013 Summer Universiade
Footballers from São Paulo (state)
Clube de Regatas do Flamengo (women) players